Radio House most commonly refers to:

 Radiohuset, former headquarters of the Danish national broadcaster DR
 Radiohuset, the main headquarters building of Sveriges Radio in Stockholm
 Flagey Building, headquarters of the former Belgian national broadcaster INR/NIR